Welcome to the Monkey House is a collection of 25 short stories written by Kurt Vonnegut, published by Delacorte in August 1968. The stories range from wartime epics to futuristic thrillers, given with satire and Vonnegut's unique edge. The stories are often intertwined and convey the same underlying messages on human nature and mid-twentieth century society.

Contents
 "Where I Live" (Venture- Traveler’s World, October 1964)
 "Harrison Bergeron" (The Magazine of Fantasy and Science Fiction, October 1961)
 "Who Am I This Time?" (The Saturday Evening Post, 16 December 1961)
 "Welcome to the Monkey House" (Playboy, January 1968)
 "Long Walk to Forever" (Ladies Home Journal, August 1960)
 "The Foster Portfolio" (Collier's Magazine, 8 September 1951)
 "Miss Temptation" (The Saturday Evening Post, April 21, 1956)
 "All the King's Horses" (Collier's Magazine, 10 Feb 1951)
 "Tom Edison's Shaggy Dog" (Collier's Magazine, 14 March 1953)
 "New Dictionary" (The New York Times, October 1966)
 "Next Door" (Cosmopolitan, April 1955)
 "More Stately Mansions" (Collier's Magazine, 22 December 1951)
 "The Hyannis Port Story"
 "D.P." (Ladies Home Journal, August 1953)
 "Report on the Barnhouse Effect" (Collier's Magazine, 11 February 1950)
 "The Euphio Question" (Collier's Magazine, 12 May 1951)
 "Go Back to Your Precious Wife and Son" (Ladies Home Journal, July 1962)
 "Deer in the Works" (Esquire, April 1955)
 "The Lie" (The Saturday Evening Post 24 February 1962)
 "Unready to Wear" (Galaxy Science Fiction, April 1953)
 "The Kid Nobody Could Handle" (The Saturday Evening Post, 24 September 1955)
 "The Manned Missiles" (Cosmopolitan, July 1958)
 "EPICAC" (Collier's Magazine, 25 November 1950)
 "Adam" (Cosmopolitan, April 1954)
 "Tomorrow and Tomorrow and Tomorrow" (Galaxy Science Fiction, January 1954)

The story "Der Arme Dolmetscher" is listed in the book's copyright notice as being included in this collection, but it was ultimately omitted, and does not appear in any edition of Welcome To The Monkey House.  It does appear in Vonnegut's later collection Bagombo Snuff Box.

Adaptations in other media
In 1970, Christopher Sergel adapted the collection of stories into a play, also called Welcome to the Monkey House.  The play was staged at Carolina Actors Studio Theatre in 2010.  In 1991, a short-lived television series titled Kurt Vonnegut's Monkey House aired on the United States Showtime channel. It was based on Vonnegut's stories and hosted by Vonnegut himself.

The story "D.P." was adapted for television under the title "Displaced Person" in 1985, meeting with critical success.

References in popular culture
 "Happiness By The Kilowatt", a song by Canadian Post-Hardcore band Alexisonfire, makes several references to "The Euphio Question."
 The Philadelphia-area based hardcore/post-hardcore band This Day Forward included a mostly-instrumental song "Euphio Question" on their 2003 release In Response.
 The liner notes of the 1997 "Harrison Bergeron Bound" 7" EP by The Judas Iscariot (from Long Island, NY, USA) contains a very thorough analysis of the eponymous story and its relevance to modern times.
 American hardcore band Snapcase has a song titled "Harrison Bergeron" on their 1997 album Progression Through Unlearning.
 American rock band The Dandy Warhols's 4th studio album is titled "Welcome to the Monkey House".

Other short story collections
This collection includes all but one of the twelve stories in Vonnegut's previous short story collection Canary in a Cat House, published in 1961. 
Other short stories Vonnegut wrote during the same time period are collected in a second anthology, Bagombo Snuff Box, published in 1999.

Notes

1968 short story collections
Short story collections by Kurt Vonnegut
Dystopian literature
Postmodern books